Hüsnü is a Turkish masculine given name. It is also used as a surname. People with the name include:

Given name

First name
Hüsnü Çakırgil (born 1965), Turkish basketball player
Hüsnü Doğan (born 1944), Turkish politician
Hüsnü A. Göksel (1919–2002), Turkish physician
Hüsnü Özkara (born 1955), Turkish football player
Hüsnü Özyeğin (born 1944), Turkish businessman
Hüsnü Savman (1908–1948), Turkish football player
Hüsnü Şenlendirici (born 1976), Turkish musician

Middle name
Fazıl Hüsnü Dağlarca (1914–2008), Turkish poet
Fuat Hüsnü Kayacan (1879–1963), Turkish football player and referee 
Hamit Hüsnü Kayacan (1868–1952), Turkish intellectual and sports executive
Hasan Hüsnü Erdem (1889–1974), Turkish scholar and Mufti 
Hüseyin Hüsnü Pasha (1852–1918), Ottoman admiral
Hüseyin Hüsnü Emir Erkilet (1883–1954), Ottoman general
Süleyman Hüsnü Paşa (1838–1892), Ottoman general

Surname
Mehmet Husnu (born 1972), Cypriot snooker player

See also
 Hosni (disambiguation)

Turkish masculine given names
Surnames of Turkish origin